Aizanoi, Latinized as Aezani, was a Phrygian city in western Anatolia. The city was an important political and economic centre in Roman times; surviving remains from the period include a well-preserved Temple of Zeus, unusual combined theatre-stadium complex, and macellum inscribed with the Price Edict of Diocletian. The city fell into decline in Late Antiquity. Later serving as a citadel, in 2012 the site was submitted for inscription on the UNESCO World Heritage List.

History

Settlement in the area is known from the Bronze Age. The city may have derived its name from Azan, one of three sons of Arcas and the nymph Erato, legendary ancestors of the Phrygians. During the Hellenistic period the city changed hands between the Kingdom of Pergamum and the Kingdom of Bithynia, before being bequeathed to Rome by the former in 133 BC. It continued to mint its own coins. Its monumental buildings date from the early Empire to the 3rd century.

Aezani was part of the Roman province of Phrygia Pacatiana. It became a Christian bishopric at an early stage, and its bishop Pisticus (or Pistus) was a participant at the First Council of Nicaea, the first ecumenical council, in 325. Bishop Pelagius was at a synod that Patriarch John II of Constantinople hastily organized in 518 and that condemned Severus of Antioch; he was also at the Second Council of Constantinople in 553. Bishop Gregory was at the Trullan Council of 692, John at the Second Council of Nicaea in 787, and Theophanes at both the Council of Constantinople (869) and the Council of Constantinople (879). The bishopric was at first a suffragan of Laodicea but, when Phrygia Pacatiana was divided into two provinces, it found itself a suffragan of Hierapolis, the capital of the new province of Phrygia Pacatiana II. No longer a residential bishopric, Aezani is today listed by the Catholic Church as a titular see.

After the 7th century, Aezani fell into decline. Later, in Seljuk times, the temple hill was converted into a citadel by Çavdar Tatars, after which the recent settlement of Çavdarhisar is named. The ruins of Aezani/Aizanoi were noted by European travellers in 1824. Survey work in the 1830s and 1840s was followed by systematic excavation conducted by the German Archaeological Institute from 1926, resumed in 1970, and still ongoing.

In January 2021, archaeologists led by Dr. Elif Özer from Pamukkale University announced that they had discovered a cache containing 651 Roman coins dated about 2,100 years ago in a jug buried near a stream. Researchers revealed a jug firstly in 2019. 439 pieces of coins were denarius (ancient Roman coins minted on silver), and 212 were cistophori, silver coins from Pergamum. Caesar, Brutus, Mark Antony and (young) Augustus are engraved on the mostly well-preserved coins. The find is going on display in the Museum of Anatolian Civilizations.

In August 2021, archaeologists from Dumlupinar University announced the discovery of a statue of Hygieia. The human-sized statue is portrayed with a snake in its arms. The statue was revealed inside the columned gallery which runs throughout the south wing of the agora.

In December 2021, archaeologists discovered a marble statue of Heracles.

Ancient buildings and structures

Temple of Zeus

The Temple of Zeus, situated upon a hill, was the city's main sanctuary. Ceramic finds indicate local habitation from the first half of the third millennium BC. According to a recent reading of the architrave inscription, construction of the temple began under Domitian. Inscriptions document imperial assistance from Hadrian relating to  the recovery of unpaid rents as well as the euergetism of Marcus Apuleius Eurykles. Later the Çavdar Tatars carved equestrian and battle scenes on the temple. The temple is pseudodipteral, with eight columns at the ends and fifteen along the sides. It was damaged by the 1970 Gediz earthquake and has since been restored.

Theatre and stadium

Aizanoi's theatre and stadium are built adjacent to each other and this combined complex is said to be unique in the ancient world. Separating the two is the stage building. Construction began after 160 A.D. and was complete by the mid-third century. Inscriptions again attest to the benefaction of M. Apuleius Eurycles.

Baths
Two sets of thermae have been identified. The first, between the theatre-stadium and the temple, dates to the second half of the second century and includes a palaestra and marble furnishings. The second, in the north-east of the city, was built a century later; floor mosaics depict a satyr and maenad. Rebuilt a couple of centuries later, it served as the bishop's seat.

Market
Aizanoi is the first recorded place in the world where inflation was calculated and from there spread to other cities of the Roman Empire. 
A circular macellum dating to the second half of the second century is located in the south. In the fourth century it was inscribed with a copy of the Price Edict of Diocletian, dating to 301, an attempt to limit inflation resulting from debasement of the coinage.

Colonnaded street and stoa
Recent excavations have revealed the existence of a stoa, or covered walkway, dating to ca. 400 AD, and colonnaded street.

Sanctuary of Meter Steunene
A deep tunnel inside a cave, now collapsed, was dedicated to Meter Steunene (an Anatolian Earth Mother goddess). Cult figurines made of clay have been found in excavations, along with two round pits apparently used for animal sacrifice.

Necropolis
The city's large necropolis includes examples of door-shaped Phrygian tombstones. Inscriptions give the names of deceased or donor; accompanying decoration includes, for the tombs of men, bulls, lions and eagles, and for those of women, baskets of wool and a mirror.

Museum of Kütahya
Some items from Aizanoi, among them a sarcophagus with an Amazonomachy, have been removed to the Archaeological Museum of Kütahya.

See also

Roman Asia
Roman architecture
List of World Heritage Sites in Turkey (Tentative list)

References

External links

Aizanoi Antique City (UNESCO)

Ancient Greek archaeological sites in Turkey
Former populated places in Turkey
History of Kütahya Province
Populated places in Phrygia
Roman Phrygia
Roman sites in Turkey
Roman towns and cities in Turkey
Aezani
World Heritage Tentative List for Turkey